Pseudochromis fowleri, the Philippines dottyback, is a species of ray-finned fish in the central Western Pacific, which is a member of the family Pseudochromidae.

References

fowleri
Taxa named by Albert William Herre
Fish described in 1934